Rodano is a city and comune in the Metropolitan City of Milan, Lombardy, northern Italy.

Geography 

The several spring pools that are still active are very important to the city and represent a typical feature of the Pianura Padana. The Muzzetta Springs, a WWF protected area, are an example of beautiful reserve and can be visited upon request.

Main sights
Sights include the Lombard graves on display in front of the City Hall and Europe's finest Scooter and Lambretta Museum, which offers a range of mopeds and scooters dating back to the beginning of the 20th century and the full historical archive of Innocenti, makers of the Lambretta.

People
 Thema (1972), singer

References